Balenciaga is a surname of Basque origins.

Notable people with the surname include:

 Cristóbal Balenciaga (1895–1972), Spanish Basque fashion designer and the founder of the Balenciaga fashion house
 Mariah Paris Balenciaga (born 1981), American drag queen
 Rasri Balenciaga (born 1990), Thai actress

Basque-language surnames